"How Could I Let You Get Away" is a song recorded by the American vocal group The Spinners (known as "Detroit Spinners" in the UK). Produced by Thom Bell and recorded at Philly's Sigma Sound Studios, the lush, string-augmented production of the song drew comparisons to another Bell - produced group, The Stylistics. The song was recorded for inclusion on the group's 1972 self-titled debut album on Atlantic Records. It was also the A-side of the group's first single release on Atlantic in July 1972. It was the first Spinners hit to feature lead vocals by Philippé Wynne (with Henry Fambrough on close harmony, both of their vocals were multitracked). The song had modest success on the charts, reaching number fourteen on the U.S. R&B charts and crossing over to the U.S. Pop charts peaking at number seventy seven.

Personnel
Lead vocals by Philippé Wynne and Henry Fambrough
Background vocals by Bobby Smith, Pervis Jackson, Henry Fambrough and Billy Henderson
Instrumentation by MFSB

Charts

References

1972 singles
The Spinners (American group) songs
1972 songs
Atlantic Records singles